Patrick Evenepoel (born 20 August 1968) is a retired Belgian racing cyclist. In 1993 he rode his only Grand Tour the Vuelta a España where he finished 113th. He is the father of Belgian cyclist Remco Evenepoel.

Major results
Source:
1987
 1st Overall GP Général Patton 
1991
 1st Seraing-Aachen-Seraing
1992
 3rd Brussel-Ingooigem
 8th Paris–Camembert
 10th Zomergem - Adinkerke
1993
 1st Grand Prix de Wallonie

References

External links
 

1968 births
Living people
People from Etterbeek
Belgian male cyclists
Cyclists from Brussels